Isaac Thomas Thornycroft (22 November 1881 – 6 June 1955) was an English motorboat racer who competed in the 1908 Summer Olympics representing Great Britain.

He won two gold medals in the only motor boat competitions included in the Olympics as helmsman of the Gyrinus II, which was designed by his father Sir John Isaac Thornycroft, after the only other entry in both events failed to complete the course.

He became a yacht designer and helmsman of J Class racing yachts.

References

External links
profile
Olympic profile

1881 births
1955 deaths
British motorboat racers
English Olympic medallists
Olympic motorboat racers of Great Britain
Motorboat racers at the 1908 Summer Olympics
Olympic gold medallists for Great Britain
Medalists at the 1908 Summer Olympics